Fourcade Glacier is a glacier at the head of Potter Cove, Maxwell Bay, on King George Island in the South Shetland Islands. It was named by the Polish Antarctic Expedition, 1980, after Nestor H. Fourcade of the Instituto Antartico Argentino, who made detailed geological investigations of Potter Cove and Fildes Peninsula in several seasons, 1957–58 to 1960–61.

See also
 List of glaciers in the Antarctic
 Glaciology

References 

 

Glaciers of King George Island (South Shetland Islands)